This is the discography of the Canadian DJ Felix Cartal.

Studio albums

Popular Music 
Released February 23, 2010, by Dim Mak as a digital download and on CD.

Different Faces 
Released March 27, 2012, by Dim Mak as a digital download and on CD.

Next Season 
Released May 4, 2018, by Physical Presents as a digital download.

Expensive Sounds for Nice People 
Released June 25, 2021, by Physical Presents as a digital download.

Extended plays
 Skeleton released in 2008 by Dim Mak
 The Joker released in 2011 by Dim Mak
 Solar (with Keatch) released in 2011 by Dim Mak
 Animals (with Keatch) released in 2011 by Dim Mak
 Past, Present, Felix released in 2013 by Dim Mak
 Credits released in 2014 by Dim Mak

Charted singles

Non-charted singles

As lead artist

As featured artist

Remixes

2007 
 Hostage – "Gluttony"
 Dragonette – "Take It Like a Man"
 Moving Units – "Crash N Burn Victims"
 Britney Spears – "Outrageous"

2008 
 Franz & Shape – "Psichedelica"
 Mr. Miyagi – "Pick Your Poison"
 Lazaro Casanova – "Vengaza"
 U-God – "Hips" 
 Julien K – "Spiral" 
 MSTRKRFT – "Bounce" 
 From Monuments to Masses – "Beyond God and Elvis"
 Evil Nine – "They Live"

2009 
 Acid Kids – "Mitch"
 Colin Munroe – "Piano Lessons"
 Laidback Luke – "Need Your Lovin'"
 The All-American Rejects – "Wind Blows"
 Nore featuring Kid Cudi – "Floatin in the Sky"
 Hussle Club – "I Have High Expectations for What I Want to Be But in the Mirror I Don't See Them Staring Back at Me"

2010 
 Nrotb – "Droplet"
 Green Velvet – "Harmageddon"
 Underoath – "Paper Lung"

2011 
 Chris Brown featuring Benny Benassi – "Beautiful People"
 Joachim Garraud – "We Are the Future"
 Wolfgang Gartner featuring will.i.am – "Forever"
 John Dahlback – "One Last Ride"
 Britney Spears – "I Wanna Go"

2012 
 Etienne De Crecy – "Am I Wrong"
 Crystal Fighters – "Plage"
 Neon Hitch – "F**k U Betta"
 Autoerotique – "Roll the Drums"
 The Loops of Fury – "Don't Stop"
 Steve Aoki & Tiesto – "Tornado"
 All That Glitters – "This Sound"

2013 
 The Killers – "Miss Atomic Bomb"
 Zedd – "Clarity"
 The Bloody Beetroots – "Spank"

2014 
 Jack Ü – "Take Ü There"

2016 
 Kiiara – "Feels"
 Rihanna – "Never Ending"
 Wafia - "Heartburn"
 Anna of the North - "Baby"
 Selena Gomez - "Kill Em With Kindness"
 Dillon Francis - "Anywhere"

2017 
 Galantis – "Rich Boy"
 ALMA – "Chasing Highs"
 Tokimonsta featuring MNDR – "We Love"

2019 
 MØ - "Blur"
 Ellie Goulding with Diplo featuring Swae Lee - "Close To Me"
 Astrid S – "Doing To Me"
 Felix Cartal featuring Veronica - "Over It" (Felix Cartal's Sunset Mix)

2020 
 Felix Cartal and Sophie Simmons - "Mine" (Felix Cartal's Sunset Mix)

2021 
 Felix Cartal and Kiiara - "Happy Hour" (Felix Cartal's Sunset Mix)
 Felix Cartal and Hanne Mjøen - "My Last Song" (Felix Cartal's After Hours Mix)
 Felix Cartal and Fjord - "The Life" (Felix Cartal's Sunset Mix)

2022 
 Felix Cartal - "Stranger Things Theme" (Felix Cartal's After Hours Mix)
 Paul Oakenfold and Lizzy Land - "Get to You" (Felix Cartal Remix)

2023 
 Dan Mangan - "Just Know It" (Felix Cartal's Sunset Mix)

References

Discographies of Canadian artists
Electronic music discographies